Breech Academy (also called Breech Training Academy) was a school operated by Trans World Airlines between 1969 and 1988 to train flight attendants, ticket agents, and even pilots. Management training classes were attended there by TWA employees as well as external managers and prospective managers.  It was named for TWA executive Ernest R. Breech.

History
The academy was so popular that other airlines sent their own flight attendants to the school. Previously TWA had done its training at its TWA Corporate Headquarters' Building in downtown Kansas City.
In 1972, TWA started interviewing young men for the position that was previously exclusively held by women. The name "Hostess" thus became "Flight Attendant" because of the addition of male employees to that position. Two men were in the first class started in April 1972. Neither of the first two male candidates would graduate. In the years to follow, hundreds of men would eventually graduate the Breech Academy as Flight Attendants.

Training facilities
It was a "state-of-the-art" training school for flight attendants, surpassing any and all other airline schools in United States at that time. The training included being taught inside actual interiors of airplanes such as 747s, L-1011s, and others.

In addition, physical inspections included weekly weigh-ins. There were modern classrooms, air-conditioned and well-lit with oval-type seating for the "book"-type learning.

Rooming facilities
The academy was renowned for its flight attendant dormitories which were in "pods" with decorative themes such as "Africa", "Asia" and other regional themes. In the African theme, there were leopard skins, bows, and other African type objects on the walls of the living room "pod".

Each "pod" had a sunken living room; or "Common Area" with 10 individual dorm-type rooms for two student flight attendants. These "pods" were grouped so that you could easily visit each dorm room while walking a full circle. In the evenings, many of the flight attendants in their "pod" would converge into the common area room to mingle.

Graduation 
At graduation for the flight attendants, the parents and visitors were invited to watch the graduation ceremony taking place on the school stage as the flight attendants accepted their "wings".

Breech Academy today
The Breech Academy’s old dorms are now office spaces owned by Asset Management Group. The buildings were purchased on November 11th, 2021 and the office park is being rebranded as ‘Legacy Park’.

References

External links
 We will never forget - A TWA history site, includes photos of Breech Academy

Educational institutions established in 1969
Trans World Airlines
Aviation schools in the United States
Educational institutions disestablished in 1988
Defunct private universities and colleges in Kansas
1969 establishments in Kansas